Opsigalea is a genus of moths of the family Noctuidae.

Species
 Opsigalea blanchardi Todd, 1966

References
 Natural History Museum Lepidoptera genus database
 Opsigalea at funet.fi

Cuculliinae